WOCO-FM (107.1 FM) is a radio station  broadcasting an easy listening format. Licensed to Oconto, Wisconsin, United States, the station serves Oconto County and the northern part of the Green Bay metropolitan area.  The station is currently owned by Lamardo Inc.

References

External links

OCO-FM